Crosslin is a surname. Notable people with the surname include:

 Evelyn Stocking Crosslin (1919–1991), American physician
 Julius Crosslin (born 1983), American football player
 Tom Crosslin ( 1955–2001), marijuana activist killed by an FBI agent